"Lost Without You" is a song written by American songwriters Teddy Randazzo and Billy Barberis and first released by Randazzo as a single in September 1964. It was not as successful as some of his previous releases, only peaking at number 130 on the Billboard Bubbling Under the Hot 100. The song had more success in the UK after it was covered by English singer Billy Fury, who released his version titled "I'm Lost Without You".

Billy Fury version

Release and reception
Fury released his version on New Year's Day in 1965 (it did not become a bank holiday in England until 1974). It was released with the B-side "You Better Believe It Baby", written by Jerry Ross, Kenneth Gamble and Chubby Checker and first released the previous year by Checker as the B-side to "She Wants T'Swim".

Track listing
7": Decca / F 12048
 "I'm Lost Without You" – 3:15
 "You Better Believe It Baby" – 2:03

Charts

Other versions
 In 1989, English singer Freddie Starr covered the song on his album After the Laughter.
 In 2015, New Zealand musician Marlon Williams covered the song on his eponymous album.
 In 2017 English singer Marc Almond covered the song on his album Shadows and Reflections.

References

1964 singles
1965 singles
1964 songs
Songs written by Teddy Randazzo
Decca Records singles
Billy Fury songs